Xəlfələr (also, Khalfalar) is a village and municipality in the Shabran District of Azerbaijan. It has a population of 400. The municipality consists of the villages of Xəlfələr and Yeləkəsən.

References 

Populated places in Shabran District